Nicolaas Pieter "Nick" de Jong  (born 25 March 1942) is a retired sailor from the Netherlands, who represented his country at the 1964 Summer Olympics in Enoshima. De Jong, as crew on the Dutch Flying Dutchman Daisy (H157), took the 6th place with helmsman Ben Verhagen. During the 1968 Summer Olympics in Acapulco  he crewed Daisy (H187), again with  helmsman Ben Verhagen to and an 18th place in the Flying Dutchman. For the 1972 Olympics De Jong made the switch from the Flying Dutchman to crew on the Soling with helmsman Heiki Blok and Rolf Kurpershoek. This team was nominated for the games by the KNWV. The nomination however did not resulted in a selection by the Dutch NOC.

Later De Jong was Chef d' équipe for the Dutch Olympic Sailing Team in 1992 and 1996. Nowadays De Jong helms the Dragon NED 22 and took part at the 2008 Vintage Yachting Games. Here he reached the 4th place with crew members Don van Arem and Miguel Karsters.

Sources

 
 
 
 
 
 
 
 
 
 
 
 
 
 
 
 
 
 
 
 
 
 
 
 
 
 
 
 
 
 
 

Living people
1942 births
People from Huizen
Dutch male sailors (sport)

Soling class sailors
Dragon class sailors
Sailors at the 1964 Summer Olympics – Flying Dutchman
Sailors at the 1968 Summer Olympics – Flying Dutchman
Olympic sailors of the Netherlands
Sportspeople from North Holland
20th-century Dutch people